Ali Mazaheri (born March 31, 1982, in Kermanshah, Iran) is an amateur boxer from Iran, who competed in the 2006 Asian Games in the Heavyweight (-91 kg) division and won the gold medal in the final bout against Uzbekistan's Jasur Matchanov 25–19. Mazaheri won the gold medal of the 2007 Ulan Bator in the Heavyweight (-91 kg) division.

At the Ahmed Öner Cup the southpaw beat Emad Abdelhalim Ali and Denis Poyatsika.

At the 2007 World Amateur Boxing Championships he was upset early against Milorad Gajovic (Montenegro).

He qualified for the 2008 Summer Olympics in Beijing, where he lost his debut to Russia's Rakhim Chakhkeiv.

At the 2010 Asian Games he lost to Syria's Mohammad Ghossoun.

He won the rematch against Ghoussoun to qualify for the 2012 Olympics in London and was Iran's flag bearer at the opening ceremony. On 1 August 2012, he was controversially disqualified for holding his opponent in a fight he was leading 6–4 on points. He received three warnings in quick succession from German referee Frank Scharmach before being disqualified. Mazaheri, speaking through a translator, declared that he believes the fight was a 'fixed'. The International Boxing Association has since suspended Scharmach for his questionable decision during the fight, in particular for giving Mazaheri three warnings in 56 seconds. Talking about the incident AIBA President Wu Ching-Kuo said in a statement: "I deeply regret that we had to take these decisions. However, our main concern has been and will always be the protection of the integrity and fair-play of our competitions. I will take all possible steps to reinforce this."

References

External links
 

1982 births
Living people
Heavyweight boxers
Olympic boxers of Iran
Boxers at the 2008 Summer Olympics
Boxers at the 2012 Summer Olympics
Asian Games gold medalists for Iran
Asian Games silver medalists for Iran
Asian Games bronze medalists for Iran
Asian Games medalists in boxing
Boxers at the 2006 Asian Games
Boxers at the 2010 Asian Games
Boxers at the 2014 Asian Games
Iranian male boxers
Medalists at the 2006 Asian Games
Medalists at the 2010 Asian Games
Medalists at the 2014 Asian Games
Sportspeople from Kermanshah
20th-century Iranian people
21st-century Iranian people